Strzebielino-Wieś  is a village in the administrative district of Gmina Łęczyce, within Wejherowo County, Pomeranian Voivodeship, in northern Poland.

The village has a population of 410.

See also
 History of Pomerania, for the history of the region.

References

Villages in Wejherowo County